Daphnellopsis fimbriata is a species of sea snail, a marine gastropod mollusk in the family Muricidae.

Description
The shell grows to a length of 15 mm.

Distribution
This marine species is distributed along the Philippines, New Guinea and the Loyalty Islands.

References

 Kilburn R.N. (1992) On three species of Muricidae and Columbellidae, erroneously described as Turridae. Venus 51: 215–218. page(s): 217
 Houart R. (1995["1994"]) The Ergalataxinae (Gastropoda, Muricidae) from the New Caledonia region with some comments on the subfamily and the description of thirteen new species from the Indo-West Pacific. Bulletin du Muséum National d'Histoire Naturelle, Paris, ser. 4, 16(A, 2-4): 245-297.
 Houart R. (2013) The genus Daphnellopsis (Gastropoda: Muricidae) in the Recent and Quaternary of the Indo-West Pacific province. Journal of Conchology 41(4): 465-480

External links
 

Gastropods described in 1843
Daphnellopsis